Ricky Lee Adams (January 21, 1959 – October 28, 2011) was an American former professional baseball player who played three seasons for the California Angels and San Francisco Giants of the Major League Baseball (MLB). In a three season career, Adams had a batting average of .215 and four home runs.

Career
On June 7, 1977 he was drafted by the Houston Astros in the first round, as the 14th pick, of the 1977 MLB draft. They released him April 4, 1980 after three years in the Astros farm system. On May 2, 1980 he signed as a free agent with the California Angels.

Adams made his debut with the Angels on September 15, 1982, a loss to the Chicago White Sox. Adams came into the game in the bottom of the 5th inning, replacing Tim Foli at shortstop. He did not get a chance to bat, however, being pulled for pinch hitter Daryl Sconiers in the top of the 7th inning.  Adams played in 64 games for the Angels over the next two seasons, primarily on the left side of the infield.  He spent all of 1984 in the minor leagues and was granted free agency on October 15.  He would sign with the San Francisco Giants on December 25.  Adams played in 54 games for the Giants, and would end his career with 75 games for Angels affiliates in 1987.

Death
Adams died on October 28, 2011 in Rancho Cucamonga, California after a long battle with cancer.

References

External links

1959 births
2011 deaths
American expatriate baseball players in Canada
Baseball players from California
California Angels players
Daytona Beach Astros players
Deaths from cancer in California
Deaths from melanoma
Edmonton Trappers players
El Paso Diablos players
Gulf Coast Astros players
Holyoke Millers players
Major League Baseball shortstops
Midland Angels players
People from Upland, California
Salinas Angels players
San Francisco Giants players
Spokane Indians players
Phoenix Firebirds players
Phoenix Giants players